Jakub Černín (born 8 February 1999) is a Czech footballer who currently plays as a centre back for FK Blansko on loan from FC Zbrojovka Brno.

Club career

SK Líšeň
He spend entire 2018-19 season on one-year loan in SK Líšeň and celebrated promotion into Czech National Football League.

FC Zbrojovka Brno
He made his professional debut for Zbrojovka Brno in the away match against Třinec on 31 August 2019, which ended in a draw 1:1. He came to the pitch as a substitute in 54th minute and after 10 minutes he scored his premiere goal and helped his team to equalise.

References

External links
 Profile at FC Zbrojovka Brno official site
 Profile at FAČR official site
 Profile at MSFL official site
 

1999 births
Living people
Czech footballers
Czech Republic youth international footballers
MSK Břeclav players
FC Zbrojovka Brno players
SK Líšeň players
FK Blansko players
Czech National Football League players
Moravian-Silesian Football League players
Czech First League players
Association football midfielders
People from Břeclav
Sportspeople from the South Moravian Region